The Chicago Brass Quintet is a five-piece brass quintet from Chicago, Illinois, formed in 1963 (sometimes credited as 1964), and still active. They have toured worldwide since 1980 and can be heard on recordings on the Crystal, Delos (now on Naxos) and the Centaur labels. The quintet is represented by Center Stage Artists and Patricia Alberti Artist Management.

Line-up
 Ross Beacraft - trumpet
 Dan Anderson - tuba
 Sharon Jones - French horn
 Adam Moen - trombone 
 Matthew Lee - trumpet

References

External links
 Official website

Brass quintets
Musical groups established in 1963
American brass bands
1963 establishments in Illinois